Agency Creek may refer to:

Agency Creek (Idaho), a stream in Idaho
Agency Creek (South Yamhill River tributary), a stream in Oregon